"I'm Ready for Love" is a 1966 single by Motown girl group Martha and the Vandellas. The song, produced and written by Holland–Dozier–Holland, and was written in a similar style to The Supremes' smash hit, "You Can't Hurry Love".

Background
The song, which has the narrator longing to be in love with her object of affectionThe Vandellas' version was issued as the first official release off the group's 1966 album, Watchout!, though the album's actual first single, the emotive ballad "What Am I Going to Do Without Your Love" bombed on the chart. This song renewed the Vandellas' popularity among mainstream audiences with its top ten showing.

Cash Box said that it is a "hard driving rocker has the girls spilling out a potent, effective romance lyric in a mood that should have every dancer who spins the disk on the floor."

Personnel

 Lead vocals by Martha Reeves
 Background vocals by the Andantes: Marlene Barrow, Jackie Hicks and Louvain Demps
 Instrumental track recorded in Los Angeles on August 12, 1966
 Produced by Brian Holland and Lamont Dozier
 Written by Brian Holland, Lamont Dozier and Edward Holland, Jr.

Chart performance
Scoring their biggest hit since "Nowhere to Run", rose to #9 on the Billboard Hot 100 and #2 on Billboards Hot R&B singles chart. "I'm Ready For Love" was also was a chart hit for the group in the UK where the song peaked at number twenty-two on the chart.

Other recordings
Other than the Vandellas, The Temptations also recorded a version of this song that was released on their 1967 album In A Mellow Mood.

References

External links 
 Martha and the Vandellas - "I'm Ready for Love" song review by Richard Gilliam, credits & releases at AllMusic
 Martha and the Vandellas - "I'm Ready for Love" single releases & credits at Discogs
 Martha and the Vandellas - "I'm Ready for Love" song to be listened on Spotify
 Martha and the Vandellas - "I'm Ready for Love" song to be listened on YouTube

1966 singles
Martha and the Vandellas songs
The Temptations songs
Songs written by Holland–Dozier–Holland
Gordy Records singles
1966 songs
Song recordings produced by Lamont Dozier
Song recordings produced by Brian Holland
Song recordings produced by Jeffrey Bowen